Maria Mirecka-Loryś (7 February 1916 – 29 May 2022) was a Polish World War II Resistance member. She was a member of the National Military Organization, Commander in Chief of the Women's National Military Union, member of the Union of Polish Women in America, and director of the National Board of the American Polish Congress.

Awards and honours
Cross of Merit 
Cross of Valour 
Pro Patria Medal
Commander's Cross of the Order of Polonia Restituta

References

External links

1916 births
2022 deaths
20th-century Polish women
Polish centenarians
Women centenarians
Polish women in World War II resistance
People from Nisko County
Recipients of the Armia Krajowa Cross
Recipients of the Cross of Valour (Poland)
Recipients of the Pro Patria Medal
Recipients of the Medal of the Centenary of Regained Independence
Recipients of the Silver Cross of Merit (Poland)